2006 Finals Series can refer to:
2006 AFL Finals Series
2006 NRL Finals Series